The following is a list of all team-to-team transactions that have occurred in the National Hockey League (NHL) during the 1962–63 NHL season. It lists which team each player has been traded to and for which player(s) or other consideration(s), if applicable.

Transactions 

Notes
 Trade voided in January, 1963 (exact date unknown), after Nicholson refused to report to Chicago.
 Terms of this transaction stipulated that Meissner would report to the Rangers following the 1962–63 season.

References

Transactions
National Hockey League transactions